Giuseppe Migliaccio (1658–1729) was a Roman Catholic prelate who served as Archbishop of Messina (1698–1729) and Bishop of Patti (1693–1698).

Biography
Giuseppe Migliaccio was born in Montemaggiore, Italy on 31 March 1658.
On 18 May 1693, he was appointed during the papacy of Pope Innocent XII as Bishop of Patti.
On 24 May 1693, he was consecrated bishop by Galeazzo Marescotti, Cardinal-Priest of Santi Quirico e Giulitta, with Prospero Bottini, Titular Archbishop of Myra, and Lorenzo Corsini, Titular Archbishop of Nicomedia, serving as co-consecrators. 
On 24 November 1698, he was appointed during the papacy of Pope Innocent XII as Archbishop of Messina.
He served as Archbishop of Messina until his death on 25 March 1729.

References

External links and additional sources
 (for Chronology of Bishops) 
 (for Chronology of Bishops) 
 (for Chronology of Bishops) 
 (for Chronology of Bishops) 

17th-century Roman Catholic bishops in Sicily
18th-century Roman Catholic bishops in Sicily
Bishops appointed by Pope Innocent XII
1658 births
1729 deaths